Breedon Hill is a  biological Site of Special Scientific Interest on the northern outskirts of Breedon on the Hill in Leicestershire.

This is the largest area of species rich carboniferous limestone in the county. Herbs include bulbous buttercup, harebell, burnet saxifrage, musk thistle and hairy violet.

The site is crossed by a footpath from the village to the church.

References

Sites of Special Scientific Interest in Leicestershire